Acianthera toachica is a species of orchid plant native to Peru.

References 

toachica
Flora of Peru